R-12 regional road (previously known as R-20 regional road) is a Montenegrin roadway.

It serves as the best road connection to Petnjica Municipality and can be used as alternative to  highway.

History

In January 2016, the Ministry of Transport and Maritime Affairs published bylaw on categorisation of state roads. With new categorisation, R-20 regional road was renamed as R-12 regional road.

Major intersections

References

R-12